KLSU (91.1 FM) is the student-run college radio station for Louisiana State University  in Baton Rouge, Louisiana with a radio format of variety music and specialty programming. The radio station is part of the university's Student Media Program and employs students as DJs and management staff. KLSU broadcasts across the Baton Rouge area at 23,000 watts of power, and is able to reach up to  beyond the LSU campus. The station is licensed under the Federal Communications Commission (FCC) as a non-commercial educational (NCE) radio station. KLSU is one of 700 college radio stations across the United States that submits music chart reports to the weekly publication College Music Journal magazine.

KLSU is unusual in that its callsign begins with a K but is located on the east side on the Mississippi River (which should have it beginning with a W), and the callsign was not the beneficiary of the FCC grandfather clause. During the application period for the station, it was discovered that the desired callsign, WLSU, was already held by the University of Wisconsin–La Crosse. Because KLSU would be located within a mile of the Mississippi River, the FCC granted an exemption to the K–W rule so it could have LSU in its callsign.

In April 2016, KLSU significantly upgraded their power from 5,700 watts class A to 23,000 watts class C3.

References

External links

History of KLSU

Radio stations in Louisiana
Louisiana State University
College radio stations in Louisiana
Radio stations established in 1979
1979 establishments in Louisiana